Ibou Dianko Badji (born 13 October 2002) is a Senegalese professional basketball player for the Portland Trail Blazers of the National Basketball Association (NBA), on a two-way contract.

Early life and career
In 2017–18, Badji trained with NBA Academy Africa in Saly, Senegal, where he emerged as one of the best prospects in his age group. On 27 December 2018, Badji signed with Spanish basketball club FC Barcelona and began playing for its youth sections. In December 2019, he played for U18 FC Barcelona at ANGT Valencia, where he averaged eight points, 8.8 rebounds and five blocks per game.

Professional career

Barcelona (2019–2021) 
To prepare for the 2019–20 season, Badji trained with the first team of Barcelona. He spent much of the season playing for FC Barcelona B, the club's reserve team, in the third-tier LEB Plata. On 26 October 2019, Badji had a season-high 12 points, nine rebounds and five blocks in an 86–77 win over Prat. On 18 January 2020, he recorded eight points and a season-high eight blocks in an 88–80 victory over Prat.

Força Lleida (2021–2022) 
On 4 October 2021, Badji signed with Força Lleida CE of the LEB Oro.

Wisconsin Herd (2022)
After going undrafted in the 2022 NBA draft, on 3 November 2022, Badji was named to the opening night roster for the Wisconsin Herd after signing an Exhibition 10 contract.

Portland Trail Blazers (2022–present)
On 18 November 2022, the Portland Trail Blazers announced that they had signed Badji to a two-way contract. On 7 March 2023, he underwent surgery on his left knee and was ruled out for at least eight weeks.

National team career
Badji represented Senegal at the 2019 FIBA Under-19 Basketball World Cup in Heraklion, Greece. He averaged 6.9 points, 5.1 rebounds and 3.1 blocks per game, which ranked second in the tournament, as his team finished in 15th place.

References

2002 births
Living people
Centers (basketball)
Senegalese men's basketball players
FC Barcelona Bàsquet B players
Senegalese expatriate basketball people in Spain
Basketball players from Dakar
Força Lleida CE players

Wisconsin Herd players